Calycina is a genus of fungi within the family Pezizellaceae. The genus contains about 45 species.

References

External links
Calycina at Index Fungorum

Pezizellaceae
Taxa named by Samuel Frederick Gray